Proksch is a surname. Notable people with the surname include: 

 Alfred Proksch (1908–2011), Austrian athlete 
 Alfred Proksch (politician) (1891–1981), Austrian Nazi party official   
 Josef Proksch (1794–1864), Czech pianist and composer
 Marie Proksch (1836–1900), Czech pianist, music educator, and composer
 Mark Proksch (born 1978), American comedian, actor, and writer
 Peter Proksch (1935–2012), Austrian artist
 Udo Proksch (1934–2001), Austrian fraudster and killer

Surnames from given names